Monoctenocera leucania is a species of snout moth in the genus Monoctenocera. It was described by Cajetan Felder, Rudolf Felder and Alois Friedrich Rogenhofer in 1875. It is found in Sri Lanka.

References

Moths described in 1875
Anerastiini